Jambi may refer to:

In geography
 Jambi Province, a province of Indonesia in Sumatra
 Jambi City, a city within Jambi Province
 Muaro Jambi Regency, a regency of the Jambi Province
 Jambi, Baron, Nganjuk, a village in East Java Province, Indonesia
 Jambi Airport

Historically
 Jambi Kingdom, an ancient kingdom located around the present-day Jambi Province
 Jambi Sultanate, Sumatra
 Jambi Residency, administrative unit in the Dutch East Indies

In linguistics
 Jambi Malay, the variant of the Malay language spoken in the Jambi Province

In computers
 Qt/Jambi, a software development framework

In entertainment
 Jambi (Pee-wee's Playhouse), a character from the television show Pee-wee's Playhouse
 "Jambi" (Tool song), a single from the album 10,000 Days by band Tool
 "Jambi" (Despina Vandi song), a single from the album Stin Avli Tou Paradisou by Despina Vandi